Tolsti Vrh pri Ravnah na Koroškem  is a settlement in the Carinthia region in northern Slovenia. A small part of it is in the Municipality of Dravograd, and the larger part is in the neighboring Municipality of Ravne na Koroškem.

References

External links
Tolsti Vrh pri Ravnah na Koroškem on Geopedia

Populated places in the Municipality of Dravograd